Kourtney and Khloé Take The Hamptons is an American reality television series that premiered on E! on November 2, 2014. The series is the fourth spin-off show of Keeping Up with the Kardashians, following Kourtney and Kim Take Miami, Kourtney and Kim Take New York, and Khloé & Lamar. The show featured sisters Kourtney and Khloé Kardashian who opened a new D-A-S-H location in The Hamptons on Long Island, New York.

The Kardashians' DASH boutique opened as a pop-up shop for the summer on the iconic Jobs Lane in Southampton Village. The family rented a home on a peninsula in the Hamptons hamlet of North Sea.

Cast
 Kourtney Kardashian
 Khloé Kardashian 
 Scott Disick

Episodes

References

External links 
 
 
 

2010s American reality television series
2014 American television series debuts
2015 American television series endings
Television series by Bunim/Murray Productions
Television series by Ryan Seacrest Productions
Television shows filmed in New York (state)
English-language television shows
Television shows set in New York (state)
Keeping Up with the Kardashians
Reality television spin-offs
E! original programming
American television spin-offs